Longolaelaps is a genus of mites in the family Laelapidae.

Species
 Longolaelaps longulus Vitzthum, 1926
 Longolaelaps whartoni Drummond & Baker, 1960

References

Laelapidae